Abdur Razzak Khan (12 October 1946 – 16 June 2016) was a Jatiya Party (Ershad) politician and the former Member of Parliament of Patuakhali-4. He was the organizer of the Liberation War of Bangladesh.

Early life 
Abdur Razzak Khan was born on 12 October 1946 in Patuakhali District.

Career
Khan was the Central Vice Chairman of the Jatiya Party and the President of the Patuakhali District Jatiya Party. He was a former director of Janata Bank and former commander of Muktijoddha Sangsad Patuakhali district. He was elected to parliament from Patuakhali-4 as a Jatiya Party candidate in 1986 and 1988.

Death 
Abdur Razzak Khan died on 16 June 2016.

References

1946 births
2016 deaths
People from Patuakhali district
Jatiya Party politicians
3rd Jatiya Sangsad members
4th Jatiya Sangsad members